Love Field is a neighborhood located in northwest Dallas, Texas (USA). It lies southwest of and is adjacent to Dallas Love Field Airport and is bounded by Denton Drive, Inwood Road, Harry Hines Boulevard, and Webb Chapel Extension. The neighborhood takes its name from Love Field Airport.

Economy 

The main business in Love Field is Dallas Love Field. Southwest Airlines' headquarters are located at 2702 Love Field Drive, adjacent to the airport.

There are several other large manufacturing plants in the neighborhood.

Geography 

The only body of water within Love Field is Bachman Lake. It lies between Northwest Highway and Dallas Love Field. Other notable areas are the park around Bachman lake as well as several runoffs from the Trinity River.

Education

Primary and secondary schools

Public schools 

The Dallas Independent School District operates local public schools. The area is within the Board of Trustees District 8; as of 2008 Adam Medrano represents the district.

Obadiah Knight Elementary School, a public elementary school, is within Love Field. All residents zoned to Knight are also zoned to Thomas J. Rusk Middle School and Thomas Jefferson High School .

Private schools 

Our Lady of Perpetual Help Catholic School is a Roman Catholic school of the Roman Catholic Diocese of Dallas. OLPH students range in age from Pre-K to eighth grade. OLPH is located across the street from Knight Elementary School.

Crime 

The Love Field area lies roughly within the Dallas Police Department beats 121–126, 131–135, 143, 145, 541, and 542. Within these beats a number of crimes were committed(2006):

 8 Murders
 35 Rapes
 373 Robberies
 325 Aggravated Assaults
 494 Burglaries
 2,087 Thefts
 875 Auto Thefts

References